Indian Mound Mall is a shopping center located in Heath, Ohio. It opened its doors on October 23, 1986. The mall's current anchor stores are AMC Theatre, Big Sandy Superstore, Altitude Trampoline Park, Dick's Sporting Goods, and JCPenney. There is one vacant anchor, formerly occupied by Sears.

History
Indian Mound Mall opened its doors on October 23, 1986, becoming the second indoor shopping mall in Licking County. The mall's first logo consisted of a circle with lines, and a feather that represents the native American Indian, which has "Indian Mound Mall" written on it. The original anchor stores consisted of the following: Elder-Beerman, JCPenney, Lazarus, and Hills. Crown Cinema was added to the rear of the mall in 1988. A fountain was originally located in the center of the mall from 1986 to 1997. The same year the fountain was removed, the mall added Sears to replace a freestanding store nearby, and the Crown Theaters expanded from six screens to eleven screens, which became a Hollywood Theater. In 2016, AMC Theatres bought the Hollywood Theater. In 1998, Elder-Beerman was expanded, and later closed on August 26, 2018, adding .

Target opened next to the mall in July 1995. In 1999, Hills was replaced by Ames, which in turn closed in 2002. Steve & Barry's moved into the empty store in 2004. Lazarus closed in 2004, becoming Goody's the following year. Goody's closed at the end of May 2008, and became Dick's Sporting Goods in 2011. Steve & Barry's was replaced in 2017 by Big Sandy. It was announced in early February that Lee's Kitchen Chinese restaurant would close marking the last restaurant in the Food Court. Lee's kitchen closed in early March 2020. And put a spiral of closures, when Seraphinas coffee shop closed in 2014, after being in the Food Court for over 2 years. That all changed after Osaka Japanese Grill closed up shop after a 20 year run at Indian Mound Mall in 2018. FYE left the same year 2 weeks after Osaka Grill closed. There is even a Developmental Disability center in the mall called Blend, which opened in the old Master cuts portion of the Big Sandy section of the mall.

On August 31, 2019, it was announced that Sears would be closing this location a part of a plan to close 92 stores nationwide. The store closed in December of that year.

The newest anchor Altitude Trampoline Park opened its doors November 18, 2020 in a portion of the old Elder-Beerman space. Apex Fitness Center is now open 24-hours a day for clients to work out and train.

Updated renovation pictures of Indian Mound Mall taken October 10, 2013.

References 

8 Indian Mound Mall Celebrates six new tenants for the holiday

9. Artist hopes mural gives Heath residents pride community

10.Ohio Santa committed to Christmas and kids

11.Indian Mound Mall looks to overcome Covid-19 during its 35th holiday season

12.Emergency assistance to families hurt by coronavirus

13.Indian Mound Mall collects pet food for Licking County Aging Program

14.Indian Mound Mall helps Licking County seniors in need of food for their pets

15.Indian Mound Mall opens mall for flood evacuees

16.City of Heath evacuating some residents due to flooding

External links 
 Indian Mound Mall Official Site

Buildings and structures in Licking County, Ohio
Shopping malls established in 1986
Shopping malls in Ohio
Washington Prime Group
Tourist attractions in Licking County, Ohio
1986 establishments in Ohio